UNI Airways is a Taiwanese regional airline based in Zhongshan, Taipei, Taiwan. With an operation focus on domestic routes, UNI Air is a subsidiary of Evergreen Group, making it a sister airline of the mainline operator EVA Air. It was known as Makung Airlines until 1996, when EVA Air took a majority share of the airline. In 1998, the airline merged with Great China Airlines and Taiwan Airways, which EVA Air also had interests in, to form UNI Airways (UNI Air).

The airline has had the largest market share in the domestic Taiwan market in recent years, and has expanded to include international flights. A few of its former McDonnell Douglas MD-90 and current ATR 72 aircraft were repainted and flew for parent carrier EVA Air due to overcapacity. In recent years, Uni Air has launched services to international destinations from the southern Taiwanese port city of Kaohsiung. In 2007, the airline received permission to begin flights to Japan.

General 
UNI Air has operated two-class services, with domestic business- and economy-class seating. Business-class passengers have access to EVA Air's Evergreen Lounges. UNI Air's predecessor, Makung International Airlines, operated a fleet of BAe 146 series jet aircraft. These aircraft were sold when Uni Air was formed. Uni Air's IATA Code is B7, its ICAO code is UIA, and its callsign is Glory, in reference to its sister company Uniglory Shipping Corporation. In 2012, Uni Air unveiled a new livery and tail/logo on the MD-90, the Q300 and its new ATR 72-600 aircraft.

Destinations 

The airline operates mainly to domestic and China destinations, but also operates scheduled international flights to Bangkok, Ho Chi Minh City and Seoul. Also chartered flights to Surabaya and Jeju from Kaohsiung. Uni Air's destinations are:

UNI Air also operates charter flights to Yonago, Okayama, Hakodate, Miyazaki, Koriyama, Nagasaki, Obihiro, and Asahikawa in Japan, as well as Seoul, Busan, and Jeju in South Korea for various tour groups.

UNI Air flights connect to the EVA Air network via Taipei and Kaohsiung, with service to over 40 international destinations worldwide.

Codeshare agreements
UNI Air has codeshare agreements with the following airlines:

 Air China
 EVA Air
 Hainan Airlines
 Shandong Airlines
 Shenzhen Airlines

Fleet

, Uni Air operates the following aircraft:

The airline fleet previously included the following aircraft (as of April 2015):
 BAe 146-300
 Boeing 757-200
 Bombardier Dash 8-Q200
 Bombardier Dash 8-Q300
 McDonnell Douglas MD-90-30

Accidents and incidents
On 24 August 1999, Uni Air Flight 873, a McDonnell Douglas MD-90, landed at Hualien Airport and was rolling on Runway 21, when an explosion was heard in the front section of the passenger cabin, followed by smoke and then fire. The pilot immediately braked, brought the aircraft to a stop on the runway. Then, after deploying the evacuation slides and initiating an emergency passenger evacuation, the pilot proceeded to call the tower for help. Upon receiving this call, fire squads at both the Hualien Airport and the Air Force Wing rushed to the scene to extinguish the fire. The fire was eventually put out at 13:45. While the upper part of the fuselage was completely destroyed, 90 passengers plus the crew of 6 were safely evacuated. 14 passengers were seriously injured, and another 14 suffered minor injuries. Most of the injured passengers suffered burns. There was eventually one death. Fragments produced by the explosion struck 1 passenger.

See also

 List of airlines of Taiwan
 List of companies of Taiwan
 List of airports in Taiwan
 Transportation in Taiwan
 Air transport in Taiwan
 EVA Air
 Chang Yung-fa
 Evergreen Group

References

External links

UNI Air Official website
UNI Air Korea
EVA Air

Airlines of Taiwan
Airlines established in 1988
Companies based in Taipei
Taiwanese brands
Evergreen Group
1988 establishments in Taiwan
EVA Air